The Preventing Sex Trafficking and Improving Opportunities for Youth in Foster Care Act is a bill introduced in the 113th Congress. The bill would require states to take action to address the problem of sex trafficking of foster care children.

Major provisions 
If enacted, the bill would (1) Require states to identify and report child sex trafficking victims; (2) Improve data collection; (3) Require states to create standards to give foster parents more flexibility in raising foster children; (4) Prohibit states from designating long-term foster care as the ultimate goal for children in foster care, instead attempting to place the children in permanent homes; (5) Give foster children more input in their own case plans.

The bill also would require states to make sure that foster children over aged 14 have a Social Security card, birth certificate and medical records.

Legislative history 
The bill was originally introduced by Republican Congressman Dave Reichert of Washington and Democratic Congressman Lloyd Doggett of Texas. Fifteen additional Members of Congress signed onto the bill as original cosponsors including Congressmen Vern Buchanan, Tim Griffin and Jim Renacci.

On October 23, 2013, the House Human Resources Subcommittee held a hearing on sex trafficking of youth in foster care. Witnesses who testified at the hearing included members of Congress, activists for the issue, and a victim of trafficking. On December 20, 2013, the subcommittee wrote and publicized a draft bill.

The American Bar Association, American Public Human Services Association, and National Indian Child Welfare Association responded to the subcommittee's request for public comments with suggestions to improve the bill.

Similar bills were introduced in Congress in 2013:
 S. 1118: Child Sex Trafficking Data and Response Act of 2013 introduced by Senators Ron Wyden and Rob Portman.
 S. 1870: Supporting At-Risk Children Act introduced by Senator Max Baucus
 S. 1518: Improving Outcomes for Youth At Risk for Sex Trafficking Act of 2013 introduced by Senator Orrin Hatch, parts of which were included in the Supporting At-Risk Children Act

Prostitution link 
Some media coverage of the bill highlighted the link between sex trafficking victims and prostitution. For example, in its coverage of the bill, the Sky Valley Chronicle, an online newspaper covering East Snohomish County, Washington, said that sex trafficking has reached "epidemic levels" in certain areas of the world, and that anyone engaged in prostitution under age 18 in the U.S. is considered a victim of sex trafficking.

In a blog post, the Seattle Post-Intelligencer wrote, "The legislation is an implicit admission that a lot of the prostitution enforcement that [Congressman] Reichert used to do with the King County Sheriffs Office was misguided."

Seattle's local CBS TV station, KIRO, noted in an article on its website that Reichert was a detective during the murder spree of "Green River killer" Gary Ridgway, and that many of the victims were prostitutes and runaways.

See also
 List of bills in the 113th United States Congress

Further reading 
 Academic articles
 Bump, Micah; Duncan, Julianne; Gozdziak, Elzbieta; MacDonnell, Margaret. "Second Conference on Identifying and Serving Child Victims of Trafficking", International Migration, Volume 43, Issue 1-2 (January 2005)
 Fong, Rowena; Cardoso, Jodi Berger. "Child human trafficking victims: Challenges for the child welfare system". Evaluation and Program Planning (August 2010)
 McClain, Natalie; Garrity, Stacy. "Sex Trafficking and the Exploitation of Adolescents". Journal of Obstetric, Gynecologic & Neonatal Nursing, Volume 40, Issue 2, p. 243-252 (March/April 2011)
 Agencies and organizations
 AMBER Alert
 Child Quest International
 Child Welfare Information Gateway
 National Center for Missing and Exploited Children
 National Center for Youth Law
 Polly Klaas Foundation
 Congressional hearings
 "Protecting Vulnerable Children: Preventing and Addressing Sex Trafficking of Youth in Foster Care" (Testimony submitted by National Center for Missing and Exploited Children)
 Video of House Subcommittee on Human Resources hearing on sex trafficking (C-SPAN), October 2013
 Witness list and links to all testimony, Hearing on Preventing and Addressing Sex Trafficking of Youth in Foster Care, House Subcommittee on Human Resources, October 2013
 Fact sheets
 Human Trafficking (United Nations Office on Drugs and Crime)
 Fact Sheet: Foster Care and Human Trafficking (CAS Research and Education)
 Legislation information
 Bill summary and status (THOMAS)
 H.R. 4058 bill tracking (GovTrack)

References

Proposed legislation of the 113th United States Congress